Isuzu Motors South Africa (Pty.) Ltd. is an automobile manufacturer with headquarters in Sandton (Johannesburg), South Africa.

Isuzu Trucks South Africa was founded in November 2006 with a total investment of 80 million Rand as a joint venture between Isuzu of Japan and General Motors South Africa (Pvt.) Ltd., with both investors owning 50%. Isuzu Motors Ltd. of Japan increased its share of Isuzu Trucks South Africa to 70% by buying a 20% stake from GM South Africa in 2013. In 2017, General Motors South Africa was announced to be shut down, and Isuzu will buy the remaining 30% of shares of Isuzu Trucks South Africa and merge it with the other assets of GM South Africa which Isuzu was also buying, to form Isuzu Motors South Africa.

Isuzu Trucks South Africa only handled manufacture, sales, and support of Isuzu commercial trucks (N-Series & F-Series). Isuzu KB pickups were handled by GM South Africa in addition to its Chevrolet and Opel models. The new Isuzu Motors South Africa handles both Isuzu pickups and commercial trucks.

Production capacity is 5,000 units per year of commercial trucks and 23,000 units per year of pickups. The plant management reports to the company president, Masanori Katayama.

The plant site covers an area of 16,602 square meters in the General Motors Kempston Road plant in Gqeberha, as well as other 790 square meters at its headquarters in Sandton. There are also exports to Malawi, Mauritius, Mozambique, Zambia and Zimbabwe. The South African company employs about 50 staff.

Models

References

External links
Isuzu Motors South Africa (Pty.) Ltd. Official website
7th Generation Isuzu D-Max Double CAB

Isuzu
Companies based in Sandton
Truck manufacturers of South Africa
Vehicle manufacturing companies established in 2006
Former General Motors subsidiaries
South African subsidiaries of foreign companies